Mastermind Champion of Champions is a pair of special series of BBC quiz program Mastermind, featuring past winners. The first series was broadcast in 1982 to celebrate the series' 10th anniversary and was won by Sir David Hunt over the other nine series winners.

Another series of Champion of Champions was televised Monday to Friday at 7:30pm on BBC Two in the first full week of August 2010. The series was won by future Eggheads panellist Pat Gibson. Contestants had around six weeks to prepare for their appearances.

Results

2010 series
The winner is indicated in bold.

References

2010 in British television